Marc Taylor (born 20 March 1990) is a Bahamian cricketer. Taylor is a right-handed batsman who currently represents the Bahamas national cricket team.

Taylor made his senior debut for the Bahamas against Jamaica in the 1st round of the 2008 Stanford 20/20.  Taylor scored 4 runs before being run out by Carlton Baugh.

Taylor represented the Bahamas in the 2010 ICC Americas Championship Division 1 and 2010 ICC Americas Championship Division 2.

In July 2019, he was named in the Bahamian squad for their tour of Bermuda.

In October 2021, Taylor was named in the Bahamas Twenty20 International (T20I) squad for the 2021 ICC Men's T20 World Cup Americas Qualifier tournament in Antigua. He made his T20I debut on 7 November 2021, for the Bahamas against Canada.

References

External links
Marc Taylor at Cricinfo
Marc Taylor at CricketArchive

1990 births
Living people
Bahamian cricketers
Bahamas cricket captains
Bahamas Twenty20 International cricketers